Ferrocarril Nacional de la Baja California is a former railroad line of Mexico. It is a predecessor of the Ferrocarril Sonora-Baja California line.

See also
List of Mexican railroads

Nacional de la Baja California